The following lists events that happened during 1929 in South Africa.

Incumbents
 Monarch: King George V.
 Governor-General and High Commissioner for Southern Africa: The Earl of Athlone.
 Prime Minister: James Barry Munnik Hertzog.
 Chief Justice: William Henry Solomon then Jacob de Villiers.

Events
June
 14 – The National Party under J.B.M. Hertzog wins the South African general election with an outright majority for a second consecutive term.

July
 24 – Union Airways Pty. Ltd. is founded, to be nationalised as South African Airways on 1 February 1934.

August
 26 – Union Airways commences operations.

Births
 23 May – Joe Modise, anti-apartheid activist. (d. 2001)
 2 July – Daphne Hasenjäger, South African athlete.
 21 August – Ahmed Kathrada, anti-apartheid activist. (d. 2017)
 25 December – Arthur Goldreich, South African-Israeli abstract painter and anti-apartheid activist. (d. 2011)

Deaths
 20 March – Ferdinand Foch, the First World War commander-in-chief of the Allied forces in France after whom Fochville was named. (b. 1851)
 30 October – Sir Joseph Robinson, 1st Baronet, mining magnate and Randlord

Railways

Railway lines opened
 3 April – Cape – Hermon to Porterville, .
 10 April – Cape – Ceres to Prince Alfred Hamlet, .
 16 April – Free State – Wesselsbron to Bultfontein, .
 31 July – Free State – Arlington to Lindley, .
 12 August – Transvaal – Boshoek to Middelwit, .
 31 August – Transvaal – Messina to Beitbridge, .
 14 November – Transvaal – Derwent to Stoffberg, .
 1 December – South West Africa – Seeis to Witvlei, .

Locomotives
Six new steam locomotive types, four Cape gauge and one narrow gauge, enter service on the South African Railways (SAR):
 Fourteen purpose-built Class S 0-8-0 shunting steam locomotives.
 Thirty-six Class 19A 4-8-2 Mountain type steam locomotives.
 Five Class GDA 2-6-2+2-6-2 Double Prairie type Garratt articulated branchline locomotives.
 The first two of eight Class GL 4-8-2+2-8-4 Double Mountain type Garratt locomotives on the Durban-Cato Ridge section in Natal.
 A single self-contained steam Clayton Railmotor for low-volume passenger service.
 A single narrow gauge 0-6-0 tank locomotive, built to the same design as the German South West African Class Hc of 1907, on the Otavi Railway in South West Africa.

References

History of South Africa